Lacon is a genus of click beetle belonging to the family Elateridae and the subfamily Agrypninae.

Species
These 46 species belong to the genus Lacon:

 Lacon atayal Kishii, 1991 g
 Lacon auroratus (Say, 1839) g b
 Lacon avitus (Say, 1839) g b
 Lacon bipectinatus Riese, 1989 g
 Lacon caeruleus Schimmel, 1998 g
 Lacon chabannei (Guérin, 1829) g
 Lacon churakagi (Ohira, 1971) g
 Lacon conspersus (Gyllenhal, 1808) g
 Lacon cuneatus (Candèze, 1865) g
 Lacon diqingensis g
 Lacon discoideus (Weber, 1801) g b
 Lacon fasciatus (Linnaeus, 1758) g
 Lacon funebris Solsky, 1881 g
 Lacon gillerforsi Platia & Schimmel, 1994 g
 Lacon giuglarisi Chassain, 2005 g
 Lacon graecus (Candeze, 1857) g
 Lacon impressicollis (Say, 1825) g b
 Lacon jacquieri (Candèze, 1857) g
 Lacon kapleri Platia & Schimmel, 1994 g
 Lacon kikuchii Miwa, 1929 g
 Lacon kintaroui Kishii, 1990 g
 Lacon kushihige Kishii, 1990 g
 Lacon laticollis (Candèze, 1857) g
 Lacon lepidopterus (Panzer, 1801) g
 Lacon lijiangensis g
 Lacon linearis (Candèze, 1868) g
 Lacon maculatus (LeConte, 1866) g
 Lacon mamillatus (Candèze, 1865) g
 Lacon marmoratus (Fabricius, 1801) g b (marbled click beetle)
 Lacon mausoni Hayek, 1973 g
 Lacon mekrani Candeze, 1889 g
 Lacon mexicanus (Candèze, 1857) b
 Lacon modestus (Boisduval, 1835) i g
 Lacon nadaii Platia & Nemeth, 2011 g
 Lacon nobilis (Fall, 1932) b
 Lacon pectinatus (Candèze, 1865) g
 Lacon pollinarius (Candèze, 1857) g
 Lacon punctatus (Herbst, 1779) g
 Lacon puriensis Kishii, 1991 g
 Lacon pyrsolepis (LeConte, 1866) b
 Lacon querceus (Herbst, 1784) g
 Lacon ramatasenseni (Miwa, 1934) g
 Lacon rorulentus (LeConte, 1859) g b
 Lacon sparsus (Candèze, 1865) g b
 Lacon subcostatus (Candèze, 1857) g
 Lacon unicolor Candeze, 1874 g

Data sources: i = ITIS, g = GBIF, b = Bugguide.net

References

 Biolib

Elateridae genera